HD 134687 (e Lupi) is a binary star system in the southern constellation Lupus. It is visible to the naked eye with an apparent visual magnitude of 4.81. It is a member of the ~11 million year old Upper Centaurus–Lupus subgroup of the Scorpius–Centaurus association, the closest OB association to the Sun.

This is a single-lined spectroscopic binary star system. The system is a source for X-ray emission.

The visible component has a stellar classification of B3 IV/V, matching a B-type star showing a spectrum with mixed traits of a main sequence and a subgiant star. It is 20 million years old with a projected rotational velocity of 13 km/s. The star has 6.0 times the mass of the Sun and 7.1 times the Sun's radius. It is radiating 997 times the Sun's luminosity from its photosphere at an effective temperature of 17,100 K.

References

B-type subgiants
Spectroscopic binaries
Lupus (constellation)
Lupi, e
Durchmusterung objects
134687
074449
5651
Upper Centaurus Lupus